St Mary Star of the Sea is a parish of the Roman Catholic Church in Peppermint Grove, Western Australia. Located in the Archdiocese of Perth, it is dedicated to Our Lady, Star of the Sea.

Location
The church building is located on Stirling Highway, between McNeil and Forrest streets in Peppermint Grove, a suburb of Perth in Western Australia. Given its proximity to Cottesloe, it is sometimes said to be in Cottesloe rather than Peppermint Grove. The Presbyterian Ladies' College is located behind the church.

History
The church building was built in 1904 on land donated by Dr Daniel Kenny (1860-1915). It was designed by Australian architect Michael Cavanagh (1860–1941) in the Gothic Revival style. The wrought iron fence and entrance gate, also designed by Michael Cavanagh, were added in 1937. It is made of local freestone and tiles from Marseille in France. It cost nearly £2,000 to build.

It was the second place of worship built in Peppermint Grove after St Columba's Presbyterian Church Hall, which was built on Venn Street in 1896 and later replaced by St Columba's Presbyterian Church on the corner of Venn and Keane Streets. The first service took place on 18 December 1904, when it was blessed by Bishop Matthew Gibney (1835-1925). In the beginning, the church building was used as a school on weekdays.

The church building was restored in 2013 for $120,000.

Clergy
As of 13 October 2019 the parish priest is Marcelo Parra.

References

External links
 

Roman Catholic churches in Perth, Western Australia
Gothic Revival architecture in Perth, Western Australia
Peppermint Grove, Western Australia
Gothic Revival church buildings in Australia
Roman Catholic churches completed in 1904
20th-century Roman Catholic church buildings in Australia